KBP can mean:

 The ISO 639-3 code for the Kabye language
 KBP Knowledge Based Processor, is used for processing packets in computer networks
 Kilo-base pair (kb or kbp), a unit of measurement of DNA or RNA length used in genetics, equal to 1,000 base pairs.
 KBP is the IATA airport code for Kyiv's Boryspil International Airport
 KBP Instrument Design Bureau weapon developer
 Kapisanan ng mga Brodkaster ng Pilipinas (Association of Broadcasters in the Philippines), the independent and self-regulatory association of radio and television stations and broadcasters in the Philippines.
 Kappa Beta Pi, a legal association and former sorority.